Bacdafucup: Part II is the fourth album from rap group Onyx, released on July 9, 2002, by Koch Records. The album was produced by Davinci, DR Period, Havoc, Self, Ant Boogie, Co-Stars, Scott Storch. The album features appearances by American rappers X1, Still Livin', Versatile, Platinum Plus and Felisa Marisol.

Bacdafucup: Part II debuted at number 46 on the US Billboard 200, number 11 on the Top R&B/Hip Hop Albums and number 2 on the Top Independent Albums chart.

Background 
Bacdafucup: Part II is the first album released by Onyx after the group left Def Jam. Onyx returns after Sticky Fingaz, Fredro Starr and Sonny Seeza took time off to do solo albums and become film stars. Onyx made a deal with Koch Records to release one album and came back with the sequel to their very successful debut LP Bacdafucup. Onyx reunited for Bacdafucup: Part II. The album cover even echoes that of the debut, although only the three remaining members of Onyx are featured on the new album. The album consisting of 12 new tracks and included a return to their biggest hit with "Slam Harder", DR Period track uses a clever sample of the theme song from the TV show "Welcome Back, Kotter" to introduce the song and provide melody throughout. However, "Slam Harder" is censored on the album when the rest of the LP is explicit. The song "Feel Me" was recorded on the night of September 11, 2001 and dedicated to the events that happened that day in the USA.

Mobb Deep's Havoc and X-1 guest on the new album, contributing to the fast-paced "Hold Up." Other cuts include the ode to females "She's Straight Gangster" and "Gun Clap Music," on which the trio pays tribute to three of its late hip-hop heroes—Fredro Starr apes the Notorious B.I.G.'s style, Sonee Seeza raps like Big Pun, and Sticky Fingaz delivers a 2Pac-esque verse. "We're bringing it back to the streets," Fingaz said in a statement about the new album. "A lot of things that's on the radio nowadays is candy-coated. I'll be listening to radio and I want to hear the hard s***, but it don't exist no more."

Many artists and fans alike cite a lack of creativity for the recent glut of uninspired rap albums. Onyx blame something else: lack of energy. With Bacdaf—up: Part 2, due for a June release, Onyx want to prove that they are still the kings of hardcore grime. After the relatively lukewarm response to debut solo albums from Starr (2001's Firestarr) and Fingaz (2001's [Black Trash] The Autobiography of Kirk Jones), the group has plenty of motivation to come with another batch of irresistible musical fury.

Singles 
Four singles from this album were released: "Hold Up", "Big Trucks/Bring 'Em Out Dead", "Slam Harder/Hold Up" and "Slam Harder/Bring 'Em Out Dead"

Critical response

The album mostly received negative reception from critics. Complex claimed that the album and "the passion and energy behind it wasn't nearly as believable as it was back in the early 1990s." MVRemix said of the album in retrospect that "this LP has gotten horrible reviews by critics as well as die hard Onyx fans. After the incredible Sticky Fingaz solo album or the last very dense Onyx LP ("Shut 'Em Down"), this album does seem somewhat lazy and sloppy."

Accolades
In 2012 in the Russian version of the magazine GQ rapper  commented on the choice of favorite CDs , among which was the album Onyx Bacdafucup: Part II.
In 2013 Complex put the album in their list A History of Rap Album Sequels.
In 2015 LA Weekly put the album in their list The Top 20 Rap Album Sequels of All Time.

Track listing

US edition bonus tracks
 "Hold Up (DJ Infinite Mix)" - 3:54
 "V-12"  (Produced by Davinci) - 4:01

Japanese edition bonus tracks
 "Hold Up (Remix)" - 3:54

Chart positions

References

External links 
 
Bacdafucup Part II at RapGenius
Bacdafucup Part II at Discogs
"Hold Up" at Discogs
"Big Trucks/Bring 'Em Out Dead" at Discogs
"Slam Harder/Hold Up" at Discogs
"Slam Harder/Bring 'Em Out Dead" at Discogs

Onyx (group) albums
2002 albums
Albums produced by Scott Storch
Sequel albums